Sweden competed at the 2013 World Championships in Athletics in Moscow, Russia, from 10–18 August 2013. Isabellah Andersson (marathon), Ebba Jungmark (high jump) and Jessica Samuelsson (heptathlon) were all selected to compete, but withdrew due to different causes.

Medallists

Results

Men
Track and road events

Field events

Combined events – Decathlon

Women
Track and road events

Field events

Combined events – Heptathlon

Sources
Selected athletes (Swedish Athletic Association) (Swedish)

External links
 Entry standards
 Swedish season lists

Nations at the 2013 World Championships in Athletics
World Championships in Athletics
Sweden at the World Championships in Athletics